Benjamin Hassan (born 4 February 1995) is a Lebanese-German tennis player. He has a career high ATP singles ranking of world No. 293, achieved on 12 August 2019.

Hassan represents Lebanon at the Davis Cup, where he has a W/L record of 10–6.

Davis Cup 

   indicates the outcome of the Davis Cup match followed by the score, date, place of event, the zonal classification and its phase, and the court surface.

Future and Challenger finals

Singles: 7 (2–5)

Doubles: 7 (3–4)

References

External links

1995 births
Living people
German male tennis players
Lebanese male tennis players
German people of Lebanese descent
People from Merzig-Wadern